The Drake Hotel is a hospitality venue on Queen Street West in Toronto, Ontario, Canada, near Parkdale. In addition to a nineteen-room boutique hotel, there is a restaurant lounge, corner café with street-level patio, Sky Yard roof top patio, and the Drake Underground basement nightclub and live performance venue.  The Drake Underground primarily features indie acts, though past noted performers include M.I.A., Billie Eilish and Beck.

History
The venue was opened in 1890 as Small's Hotel. At the time, the area was a major Canadian Pacific Railway hub near what was then one of the wealthiest neighbourhoods in the city.

In 1949, the hotel was acquired by new owners who expanded the building and renamed it the Drake. The hotel eventually fell into decline. James Earl Ray described visiting a bar around the corner—likely the Drake—while living as a fugitive on nearby Ossington Avenue in 1968. In the 1970s, it fell into use as a flophouse like many hotels in North American cities. Other uses in the 1980s, and 1990s include a punk bar, and rave den.

After  in renovations were completed, the Drake re-opened in February 2004. The current ownership has since expanded, opening a hotel in Wellington, Ontario, other restaurants in Toronto and the Drake General Store retail stores.

See also

 Gladstone Hotel

References
Notes

External links

Live concert photos from the Drake

Hotels in Toronto
Restaurants in Toronto
Music venues in Toronto
Nightclubs in Toronto